Ah-Shi-Sle-Pah Wilderness is located in San Juan County, New Mexico, between Chaco Canyon and the De-Na-Zin Wilderness. Its name is a phonetic transliteration of Navajo "áshįįh łibá" meaning "salt, it is grey (grey salt)". The wilderness has multicolored badlands, sandstone hoodoos, petrified wood and dinosaur bones, similar to those found in the nearby Bisti Badlands and De-Na-Zin Wilderness.

History
The BLM Wilderness Study Area (WSA) was declared in May 1992 and would protect an area of about 26.5 km2 (6,563 acres).  The area was prospected by the dinosaur hunter Charles Hazelius Sternberg in the summer of 1921.  Sternberg collected the type specimen of Pentaceratops fenestratus, a ceratopsid dinosaur from the late Cretaceous Period, within the WSA. Specimens from this area form a significant part of the vertebrate paleontology collection at the Museum of Evolution, University of Uppsala, Sweden. Fossil collecting here without a permit is prohibited by law.

The John D. Dingell, Jr. Conservation, Management, and Recreation Act, signed March 12, 2019, authorizes the establishment of the Ah-Shi-Sle-Pah Wilderness as a component of the National Wilderness Preservation System, protecting approximately 7,242 acres.

Geology
Rock units within the Ah-Shi-Sle-Pah WSA include most of the upper Fruitland Formation (Fossil Forest Member) and lower part of the Kirtland Formation (Hunter Wash Member), both late Cretaceous in age. The rocks are dominated by mudstones and intermittent sandstones, with occasional resistant channel sandstones.

See also

 Bisti/De-Na-Zin Wilderness
 Kasha-Katuwe Tent Rocks National Monument
 Demoiselles Coiffées de Pontis
 Đavolja Varoš

References

External links
Ah-shi-sle-pah Wilderness, Bureau of Land Management 
Ah Shi Sle Pah Wash, Hoodoo king of the San Juan Basin badlands at Inside Outside Southwest magazine
Ah-Shi-Sle-Pah gallery by photographer John Fowler
Ah-Shi-Sle-Pah Wilderness at Wikimapia

Cretaceous geology of New Mexico
Bureau of Land Management areas in New Mexico
Protected areas of San Juan County, New Mexico
Rock formations of New Mexico
Landforms of San Juan County, New Mexico
Nature reserves in New Mexico
1992 establishments in New Mexico
Protected areas established in 1992